Meehania is a genus of flowering plants in the family Lamiaceae, first described in 1894. It is native to China, Japan, and the eastern United States.

Species
 Meehania cordata (Nutt.) Britton - Appalachian Mountains of eastern United States (Tennessee, North Carolina, Kentucky, Virginia, West Virginia, Pennsylvania, Ohio) 
 Meehania faberi (Hemsl.) C.Y.Wu - Gansu, Sichuan 
 Meehania fargesii (H.Lév.) C.Y.Wu - Guangdong, Guangxi, Guizhou, Hubei, Hunan, Jiangxi, Sichuan, Yunnan, Zhejiang 
 Meehania henryi (Hemsl.) Y.Z.Sun ex C.Y.Wu - Guizhou, Hubei, Hunan, Sichuan 
 Meehania montis-koyae Ohwi - Honshu, Fujian, Zhejiang 
 Meehania pinfaensis (H.Lév.) Y.Z.Sun ex C.Y.Wu - Guizhou 
 Meehania urticifolia (Miq.) Makino - Japan, Korea, Russian Far East, Jilin, Liaoning

References

Lamiaceae
Lamiaceae genera